Kazuko Ito (born 21 August 1963) is a Japanese former professional tennis player.

Ito represented Japan at the 1982 Asian Games in New Delhi and won two medals, a women's doubles silver and a bronze in the team event.

As a professional player she had the biggest impact in doubles, with three main draw appearances at the Australian Open and one at the French Open. She was a doubles quarter-finalist at the 1989 Pan Pacific Open.

ITF finals

Doubles (3–1)

References

External links
 
 

1963 births
Living people
Japanese female tennis players
Asian Games silver medalists for Japan
Asian Games bronze medalists for Japan
Asian Games medalists in tennis
Medalists at the 1982 Asian Games
Tennis players at the 1982 Asian Games